The 4th Signal Group was a group sized unit of the Royal Corps of Signals within the British Army that supported the British Army of the Rhine.  The group's main job was to supervise all of the static communications used by the British Forces in Germany. It supported the British Army of the Rhine and 2nd Allied Tactical Air Force for just under 30 years.

History 
The 4th Signal Group was originally formed in 1969 after major reforms to the British Army, the group was created from the original HQ Chief Air Formation Signals Branch, British Army of the Rhine.  The group was interestingly created as a result of an agreement between the Royal Air Force and British Army.  The army agreed to take control of the signals between the British Army of the Rhine and the 2nd Tactical Air Force of the RAF.  The group's first HQ was at JHQ Rheindahlen where it commanded the 16th Signal Regiment (Supported BAOR), 21st Signal Regiment (Supported 2nd TAF), and Signals Works Service Troops (Static Rear Communications).  Because there was no war with the Soviet Union the group never saw active service.  In 1992 as a result of the Options for Change the group was disbanded and in its place the new Headquarters Communications Branch, British Army of the Rhine was created.  In 1990 during Operation Granby, the 16th Signal Regiment, making is the only regiment of the entire group to deploy during its entire existence,

Units 
Structure of the group in 1969;

 16th Signal Regiment
 21st Signal Regiment
 Signals Works Service Troops

Structure of the group in 1989:

 4th Signal Group (British Army of the Rhine), HQ at Joint Headquarters, Rheindahlen
 13th Signal Regiment (Radio), Royal Corps of Signals, at Mercury Barracks, Birgelen (Signals Intelligence unit)
 No. 3 Signal Squadron, at RAF Gatow, West Berlin
 16th Signal Regiment (British Army of the Rhine), Royal Corps of Signals, at Bradbury Barracks, Krefeld
 No. 1 Signal Squadron, at Joint Headquarters, Rheindahlen
 No. 4 Signal Squadron, at Joint Headquarters, Rheindahlen
 21st Signal Regiment (Air Support), Royal Corps of Signals, at RAF Wildenrath (tasked with supporting RAF Germany and 2nd Allied Tactical Air Force)
 608 Signal Troop (Cipher Equipment), Royal Corps of Signals, in Viersen
 Signal Works Service Troop, Royal Corps of Signals

Notes

References 

Group sized units of the British Army
Communications units and formations of the British Army
Military units and formations established in 1969
Military units and formations disestablished in 1992